Glengarry is a settlement in western Prince Edward Island.

Communities in Prince County, Prince Edward Island